Tatsuo Itoh (1940-2021) was Professor and holder of the Northrop Grumman Chair in Microwave and Millimeter Wave Electronics in the Electrical Engineering Department at the University of California, Los Angeles (UCLA), where he taught and conducted research on microwave and millimeter wave electronics, guided wave structures, low power wireless electronics, and integrated passive components and antennas.

Professor Itoh received the Bachelor of Science and Master of Science degrees in Electrical Engineering from Yokohama National University in 1964 and 1966, respectively. He received the Doctor of Philosophy degree in Electrical Engineering from the University of Illinois at Urbana–Champaign in 1969.

Professor Itoh served as Editor-in-Chief of the IEEE Transactions on Microwave Theory and Techniques (1983–1985), and of the IEEE Microwave and Guided Wave Letters (1991–1994). He served as President of the IEEE Microwave Theory and Techniques Society in 1990. He has received a number of awards, including the 1998 Shida Award from the Japanese Ministry of Post and Telecommunications and the 1998 Japan Microwave Prize.

Awards and honors
Japan Microwave Prize  (1998)
Shida Rinzaburo Award from the Japan Ministry of Post & Telecommunications  (1998)
Distinguished Alumnus Award, Electrical and Computer Engineering Department, University of Illinois at Urbana–Champaign (1999)
IEEE Third Millennium Medal  (2000)
IEEE Distinguished Microwave Educator Award (2000)
Nikola Tesla Award  (2001)
Member of National Academy of Engineering (2003)
IEEE Distinguished Microwave Lecturer (2004–06)
Fellow of the National Academy of Inventors (2014)
IEEE Electromagnetics Award (2018)

Books
T. Itoh, editor, Planar Transmission Line Structures IEEE Press, NY, 1987.
T. Itoh, editor, Numerical Techniques for Microwave and Millimeter-wave Passive Structures Wiley, NY, 1989.
T. Itoh, G. Pelosi, and P. P. Silvester, editors, Finite Element Software for Microwave Engineering, Wiley, NY, 1996.
T. Itoh and B. Houshmand, Time-Domain Methods for Microwave Structures: Analysis and Design, Wiley NY, 1998 1998
T. Itoh, G. Haddad, and J. Harvey, editors, RF Technologies for Low Power Wireless Communications Wiley Inter-Science, 2001.
C. Caloz and T. Itoh, Electromagnetic Metamaterials, Wiley-IEEE Press, 2005.

Patent(s)
Link to USPTO search for patents having inventor names "itoh" and "tatsuo" and an assignee name including the string "regent"

References

External links

UCLA Microwave Electronics Laboratory homepage
UCLA Electrical Engineering Department homepage

Living people
21st-century American engineers
Electrical engineering academics
Yokohama National University alumni
Grainger College of Engineering alumni
University of Illinois faculty
UCLA Henry Samueli School of Engineering and Applied Science faculty
Members of the United States National Academy of Engineering
Microwave engineers
Metamaterials scientists
1940 births
American telecommunications engineers
Japanese emigrants to the United States